Pleasant Valley Wildlife Sanctuary is a  wildlife sanctuary located in Lenox, Massachusetts owned by the Massachusetts Audubon Society. There are 7 miles of trails and a large pond on Yokun Brook. One trail hikes to the summit of Lenox Mountain (2126 feet).

Pleasant Valley has an outdoor summer day camp, seasonal special events, and year-round educational programs for preschoolers to adults.

History
The sanctuary was founded in 1929, when members of the Lenox Garden Club established a new organization, the Pleasant Valley Bird and Wildflower Sanctuary. The first director was Maurice Broun. The sanctuary was acquired by Mass Audubon in 1950.

Gallery

References

External links

Protected areas of Berkshire County, Massachusetts
Lenox, Massachusetts
Massachusetts Audubon Society